Rhombodera valida is a species of praying mantises in the family Mantidae, found in Indomalaya.

Etymology
In Latin "valida" means strong, powerful or valid. Rhomboid shape. In Greek dera means neck.

Description
Rhombodera valida has a broader, sub-circular, rhomboidal pronotum than Rhombodera basalis.

See also
 List of mantis genera and species
 Mantodea of Asia
 Leaf mantis
 Shield mantis

References

v
Mantodea of Asia
Insects of China
Insects of Timor
Insects of India
Insects of Indonesia
Insects of Japan
Insects of Korea
Insects of Malaysia
Fauna of Java
Insects described in 1838